The Robert N. C. Nix Sr. Federal Building and United States Post Office, formerly known as the United States Court House and Post Office Building, is a historic building in Philadelphia, Pennsylvania.

History
Built between 1937 and 1941, Nix Federal Building was designed by Harry Sternfeld in the Moderne style and features several sculptures and reliefs by Donald De Lue and Edmond Amateis. It was renamed in December 1985 in honor of Robert N.C. Nix Sr., a longtime Democratic Congressman from Pennsylvania's 1st Congressional District in Philadelphia, and the first African-American to represent Pennsylvania in Congress.

The building was listed on the National Register of Historic Places in 1990, and is part of the Mark East neighborhood.

Architecture
The building is located in Center City Philadelphia on a  lot bounded by Market Street to the north, Ninth Street to the east, and Chestnut Street to the south, and an alley to the west. It measures  along Chestnut and Market Streets by  along Ninth Street. A light court provides access to outside air and light from the third to the sixth floor.

The steel structure is encased in concrete and the foundation and basement walls are reinforced concrete.  Interior walls are concrete, clay tile, or brick. The base of the building is faced with Milford pink granite with Indiana limestone covering most of the facades facing the street.  Buff-colored brick covers the facades of the interior light court.

Central air-conditioning was a feature of the original construction, but records indicate that more than 270 window units were installed over time, and then removed during a 1989 restoration. Handicapped access was installed at the eastern entrance on Market Street, but otherwise the exterior appears as it was originally designed.

The first floor is occupied by a post office, while courtrooms and a law library occupy the second floor. Upper floors contain offices, open plan office space, meeting rooms and similar spaces. The National Archives at Philadelphia is entered on Chestnut Street.  The facility "maintains the historically significant records of the Federal Agencies and Courts, in Delaware, Maryland, Pennsylvania, Virginia and West Virginia, dating from 1789 to the present" and is open to the public.

Gallery

See also
Mail Delivery (sculptures)

Notes

References

External links

Moderne architecture in Pennsylvania
Government buildings completed in 1937
Government buildings on the National Register of Historic Places in Philadelphia
Courthouses on the National Register of Historic Places in Pennsylvania
Post office buildings on the National Register of Historic Places in Pennsylvania
Market East, Philadelphia